Charles Anderton (c.1868-1959?) was a rugby union player for England.

References

1868 births
1959 deaths
England international rugby union players